The Lula G. Scott Community Center is a historic site located at Shady Side, Maryland in Anne Arundel County, Maryland, United States. It now consists of two frame buildings that were built as Rosenwald Schools. 

The buildings originally were built on separate sites. The Churchton School was constructed in 1921 and the Shady Side School was constructed in 1926. Both were built as single-story schools with two-room-plans. Decades later, one of the school buildings was moved to the site of the other, and expansion followed. 

The Churchton school was moved to the Shady Side School site in 1953. A wing was added in 1958.

The site was listed on the National Register of Historic Places in 2009.

See also
Queenstown Rosenwald School

References

External links
, at Maryland Historical Trust

Community centers in Maryland
Buildings and structures in Anne Arundel County, Maryland
Rosenwald schools in Maryland
National Register of Historic Places in Anne Arundel County, Maryland
School buildings on the National Register of Historic Places in Maryland
School buildings completed in 1921
1921 establishments in Maryland